Premier University, also known as PU and PUC, is a private university in Chittagong, Bangladesh. It was established in 2002.

History

The ex-mayor of Chittagong City Corporation, ABM Mohiuddin Chowdhury, conceived the idea of establishing a center of excellence for higher education and learning in Chittagong and initiated a needs assessment in 1998. A project proposal for Premier University was submitted to the Ministry of Education of Bangladesh in May 2001. The proposal was approved by the government of Bangladesh under the Private University Act (1992), and the University Grants Commission (Bangladesh) (UGC) approved the curricula of Premier University.

The university came into being on 5 December 2001 and launched its academic programs in January 2002. During 2022, the university arranged its third convocation.

During the first years, the university offered a four-year bachelor's and two-year master's degrees in only a few subjects.

Campus

Laboratories
 Computer Labs
 Circuits and Electronics Lab
 Machines and Power system Lab
 Communication and Microprocessor Lab
 Design Studio
 PLC Lab
 Physics  Lab
 Chemistry  Lab
 Simulation  Lab
 Switchgear & Protection Lab

Organization and administration

Anupam Sen is the vice-chancellor of the university and has served since October 2006.

There are six faculties: Faculty of Business Study, Faculty of Law, Faculty of Engineering, Faculty of Arts, Faculty of Science, and Faculty of Social Science.

List of vice-chancellors 
 Anupam Sen ( present )

Academics

Faculty of Business Study
The faculty has five departments: Department of Accounting, Department of Finance, Department of Human Resource Management, Department of Management, and Department of Marketing. It offers the following undergraduate and postgraduate degrees:
 Bachelor of Business Administration (BBA)
 Master of Business Administration (MBA)
 Executive Master of Business Administration (EMBA)
 Bachelor of Mathematics. (From 2019)

Faculty of Law

Department of Law
The department of Law offers the following undergraduate and postgraduate degrees:
 Bachelor of Law (LLB)
 Master of Law (LLM)

Faculty of Engineering

Department of Architecture
The department offers a Bachelor of Science in architecture.

Department of Computer Science and Engineering
The department was established in 2002. The department offersthe following degrees
 B.Sc. in Computer Science & Engineering
 M.Sc. in Computer Science & Engineering

Department of Electrical and Electronic Engineering
The department offers the following degree
 B.Sc. in Electrical & Electronic Engineering

Faculty of Arts

Department of English
The department of English offers the following degrees:
 Bachelor of Arts (Honors) in English (BA in English)
 Master of Arts in English (MA in English)

Faculty of Science

Department of Mathematics
The Department offers the following degrees:
 Bachelor of Science (Hons.) in Mathematics
 Master of Science in Mathematics

Department of Public Health
The Department offers the following degrees:

Master of Public Health

Faculty of Social Sciences

Department of Economics
The Department of Economics offers the following degrees:
 Bachelor of Social Science (Honors) in economics
 Master of Social Science in economics

References

External links

 Official website

Educational institutions established in 2002
Private universities in Bangladesh
Universities and colleges in Chittagong
2002 establishments in Bangladesh